The year 612 BC was a year of the pre-Julian Roman calendar. In the Roman Empire, it was known as year 142 Ab urbe condita . The denomination 612 BC for this year has been used since the early medieval period, when the Anno Domini calendar era became the prevalent method in Europe for naming years.

Events
 Battle of Nineveh: An allied army of Babylonians, Medes, Scythians, and Susianians besieges and conquers Nineveh, capital of the Neo-Assyrian Empire. Sinsharishkun, King of Assyria, is killed in the sacking.
 Babylon, capital of the Neo-Babylonian Empire, becomes the largest city in the world, taking the lead from Nineveh.
 Ashur-uballit II attempts to keep the Assyrian state alive by establishing himself as king at Harran.
 King Kuang of Zhou becomes king of the Zhou Dynasty of China.

Births

Deaths
 Sinsharishkun, Assyrian king

References